Will Talbot-Davies (born 11 September 1997) is an English professional rugby union player who plays for Coventry as a fullback or winger.

Talbot-Davies made his debut for the Dragons in 2016 having previously played for the Dragons academy and Ebbw Vale RFC. In June 2022, Talbot-Davies signed with Coventry RFC for the 2022-23 season.

References

External links 
Dragons profile
itsrugby.co.uk profile

1997 births
Living people
Dragons RFC players
Welsh rugby union players
Rugby union fullbacks
Rugby union players from Solihull

Coventry R.F.C. players